Korean cherry is a common name for several flowering plants and may refer to:

 Prunus japonica, also known as Japanese bush cherry or Oriental bush cherry, with sour edible fruit, widely cultivated as an ornamental tree or shrub
 Prunus maximowiczii, also known as Korean mountain cherry or Miyama cherry, a cherry tree with edible fruit

See also
Nanking cherry